Anthony Dent is an American songwriter and producer, best known for co-writing global hit "Survivor" for Destiny's Child, as well as "Friend of Mine" for Kelly Price. Originally a member of Bad Boy Records' famed production outfit The Hitmen, Dent left to create his own production company, State Of Mind Muzic Inc., where he began mentoring and signing new artists, including singer-songwriter Keri Hilson.

Songwriting and production credits
Credits are courtesy of Discogs, Tidal, Apple Music, and AllMusic.

Guest appearances

Awards and nominations

References 

Living people
African-American songwriters
Year of birth missing (living people)